Anartia jatrophae, the white peacock, is a species of butterfly found in the southeastern United States, Central America, and throughout much of South America. The white peacock's larval hosts are water hyssop (Bacopa monnieri),  lemon bacopa (Bacopa caroliniensis), tropical waterhyssop (Bacopa innominata), frogfruit (Phyla nodiflora), lanceleaf frogfruit (Phyla lanceolata), and Carolina wild petunia (Ruellia caroliniana).
The males of the species display a unique territorial behavior, in which they stake out a territory typically 15 meters in diameter that contains larval host plants. They perch in this area and aggressively protect it from other insects and other male white peacocks.

Subspecies
Seven subspecies are recognized.

 A. j. guantanamo - Florida and Cuba
 A. j. intermedia - Saint Croix
 A. j. jamaicensis - Jamaica
 A. j. jatrophae - South America from Venezuela to Argentina
 A. j. luteipicta - Central America from Mexico to Colombia
 A. j. saturata - Brazil
 A. j. semifusca - Puerto Rico

References

External links

Protein sequencing

Anartia
Butterflies of Central America
Butterflies of the Caribbean
Butterflies of North America
Butterflies of Trinidad and Tobago
Nymphalidae of South America
Butterflies described in 1763
Taxa named by Carl Linnaeus